Little Miss London is a 1929 British silent comedy film directed by Harry Hughes and starring Pamela Parr, Frank Stanmore and Reginald Fox. It was made by British Instructional Films at Bushey Studios. The screenplay concerns a business magnate who poses as a poor man while his daughter falls in love with a man posing as an aristocrat.

Cast
 Pamela Parr as Moly Carr
 Frank Stanmore as  Ephraim Smith
 Reginald Fox as Burton Gregg
 Pauline Johnson as Jill Smith
 Eric Bransby Williams as Jack
 Marie Ault as Mrs Higgins
 Charles Dormer as Lord Blurberry

References

Bibliography
 Low, Rachel. The History of British Film: Volume IV, 1918–1929. Routledge, 1997.
 Shafer, Stephen C. British Popular 1929-1939: The Cinema of Reassurance. Routledge, 1997.

External links

1929 films
British comedy films
British silent feature films
1929 comedy films
Films directed by Harry Hughes
Films set in London
Bushey Studios films
British black-and-white films
1920s English-language films
1920s British films
Silent comedy films